The Tomb of Charles Spencer Ricketts is located in Kensal Green Cemetery in the Royal Borough of Kensington and Chelsea, London, England. It commemorates Commander Charles Spencer Ricketts, an officer in the Royal Navy. Designed in 1868 by William Burges, the tomb is a Grade II* listed structure.

History
Charles Spencer Ricketts (1788–1867) had entered the Royal Navy at the age of seven. Serving under Thomas Cochrane, "Le Loup de Mer", during the Napoleonic Wars, he retired aged 26 on marrying an heiress, and established himself as a country squire at Dorton House, Buckinghamshire, rising to the post of High Sheriff in 1832. The marriage was not happy, and he spent his last years at the London home of his daughter, Julia, who had married a solicitor, George Bonnor. On Ricketts's death in 1867, Julia Bonnor commissioned William Burges to design her father's tomb. Burges's diaries for 1867–68 include two references to "Bonnor's tomb" and the structure was complete by the end of 1868. The condition of the tomb deteriorated in the 20th century, but in the 21st it has been the subject of renovation and preservation.

Architecture and description
The tomb takes the form of a bier, resting on fifteen pedestals, twelve on the edges, and three running down the centre of the sarcophagus. This is surmounted by a stone canopy, itself supported on eight colonettes. The canopy roof has eight gables, each topped by crockets, and with eight gargoyle waterspouts. The outer colonettes are carved from Peterhead granite, the inner columns from Cornish serpentine marble. The latter has not worn well. The rest of the structure is carved Portland stone.

Architectural critics have generally viewed the tomb with dismay. Nikolaus Pevsner, in his early volume, London II, in the Buildings of England series, described it as being "atrociously rich", while remaining unaware of its designer. The revised Pevsner, London 3: North West, updated by Bridget Cherry, tempers the earlier criticism, calling the structure a "gorgeously rich Gothic shrine". Burges's biographer, J. Mordaunt Crook, in his study, William Burges and the High Victorian Dream, writes, "hunched like a porcupine, fattened to the point of obesity, its reptilian form is almost a parody of Early French". The tomb's reputation has subsequently risen with that of its designer; Richard Barnes, in his study The Art of Memory: Sculpture in the Cemeteries of London, assesses it as “one of the greatest High Victorian memorials in the country”. The tomb is a Grade II* listed structure.

Footnotes

References

Sources

External links

 Article on the tomb's restoration, prepared by Odgers Conservation Consultants
 Entry on the tomb at The Victorian Web

Burials at Kensal Green Cemetery
Grade II* listed buildings in the Royal Borough of Kensington and Chelsea
Kensal Green
William Burges buildings